Bologna Football Club 1909, commonly referred to as Bologna, is an Italian professional football club based in Bologna, Emilia-Romagna that plays in Serie A, the top flight of Italian football. The club have won seven top-flight titles, two Coppa Italia titles, and one UEFA Intertoto Cup.

Founded in 1909, Bologna were founding members of Serie A, and won many of their league championships during the late 1930s. The club ceded any league dominance by 1964, when they won their last league title to date. They won their two Coppa Italia titles in the 1970s, before battling relegation throughout the latter part of the 20th century. Bologna changed ownership multiple times during the early 2000s and 2010s, due to financial mismanagement, and later stabilized under the guise of a Canadian consortium led by Joey Saputo.

Bologna have participated in 75 Serie A seasons, which is the ninth-most in Italian football history. The club have played in the Stadio Renato Dall'Ara since 1927, which is the tenth-largest stadium by capacity in Serie A.

History

Bologna Football Club's formation was orchestrated by Emilio Arnstein, an Austrian who became interested in football at university in Vienna and Prague. He and his brother had previously founded another football club, Black Star, in Austria.

The club was founded on 3 October 1909, in the Northern Italian city of Bologna. Upon its formation, Carlo Sandoni was the club's sponsor and general manager, Swiss Louis Rauch became president, nobleman Guido Della Valle was the vice-president, Enrico Penaglia secretary, Sergio Lampronti cashier, while Emilio Arnstein and Leone Vincenzi were appointed councilmen.

On 20 March 1910, Bologna played their first ever game, against Virtus, who wore white shirts. Bologna outclassed their opponents, winning 9–1. The first football squad featured; Koch, Chiara, Pessarelli, Bragaglia, Guido Della Valle, Nanni, Donati, Rauch, Bernabeu, Mezzano, and Gradi.

Their formative season was spent in the regional league under Arrigo Gradi as captain, Bologna won their league gaining promotion to a league named Group Veneto-Emiliano. They spent four seasons in this league, never finishing lower than fifth. Bologna were entered into the Northern League before all football leagues were postponed for World War I.

Champions: 1920s and 1930s
After the first war, Bologna began to become more successful. First reaching the semi-finals of the Northern Italian competition in 1919–20, they went one better the following season by reaching the Northern League finals, going out 2–1 to Pro Vercelli. They would equal this again in 1923–24, coming runner up to eventual national champions Genoa.

Bologna became Northern and National League champions for the first time during 1924–25, beating Genoa CFC after five hard-fought final matches to take the championship. The finals against the Ligurian giants were marred by heavy crowd troubles. A few seasons later Bologna became champions of Italy for the second time in 1928–29 giving them a foothold in Italian football, building up a legacy, this was the last time the league was competed in the old system, Serie A was instated the following year.

Bologna won the Scudetto three more times before World War II, in 1935–36, 1936–37 and 1938–39, and once during the war (1940–41).

Post-World War II
After World War II, the club was less successful. Throughout the 1950s and 1960s, the club generally floated between fourth, fifth and sixth position in the league, until they took the league title back in 1963–64. To date this remains their last Serie A championship, bringing the club's total to seven. This qualified Bologna to the 1964–65 European Cup (today UEFA Champions League), but they were eliminated in the preliminary round against Anderlecht.

It was not all doom and gloom for the club, however; in the 1970s, they won the Italian Cup twice, the second of which was disputed against Palermo. The game was tense and finished 1–1 before going to a penalty shootout, where Bologna won 4–3.

Climbing down and back up the Leagues
Beginning in the 1981–82 season, the club began to slide. First, they were relegated from Serie A after battling it out for survival with Cagliari and Genoa. They were relegated twice in succession and slid into Serie C1. They won their way out of C1 the next year, and returned to Serie A for the 1988–89 season after four years of fighting it out in Serie B.

They did not remain long, however, being relegated in 1991 and returning to Serie C1 in 1993. The club returned to Serie A for 1996. Two years later, Bologna tasted a slice of success on the European stage, winning the UEFA Intertoto Cup and playing in the UEFA Cup. The club remained in Serie A until the 2004–05 campaign, losing to Parma in the playoffs.

Serie B
Despite losing some key players, Bologna expected to be challenging strongly for promotion from Serie B in the 2005–06 campaign. Despite its ambition, however, Bologna had a poor start to the season, causing the sacking of experienced coach Renzo Ulivieri, replaced by former Internazionale defender Andrea Mandorlini.

During this time, the team was sold by Giuseppe Gazzoni Frascara to Alfredo Cazzola, a local entrepreneur. Mandorlini, however, was not either able to bring Bologna up the Serie B table, and was fired on 5 March 2006; Ulivieri was then appointed back as team coach, after having been sacked a few months before. Bologna ended the 2005–06 Serie B campaign in eighth place. In the 2006–07 season, Bologna ended with the seventh place: there were several clashes between chairman Cazzola and head coach Ulivieri, who was ultimately fired on 14 April 2007 and replaced by caretaker and former assistant coach Luca Cecconi. For the 2007–08 season, Bologna was led by Daniele Arrigoni, who helped the rossoblù achieve automatic promotion back to the top flight after finishing second in Serie B.

Serie A
During the summer of 2008, a club takeover was agreed between Cazzola and an American-based consortium; this was, however, cancelled in the end, following disagreements between the parties, and the club was successively sold to a local group led by new chairman Francesca Menarini, who thus became the second female chairman in the whole Serie A. Arrigoni was confirmed as head coach by the new group, and the start appeared to be particularly impressive, with a surprising 2–1 win at San Siro against Milan thanks to a winning goal scored by Francesco Valiani. The next weeks saw Bologna struggling in the league, however, with eight losses in nine matches. A disappointing 5–1 loss to Cagliari ultimately led the club management to sack Daniele Arrigoni on 3 November 2008 and appoint Siniša Mihajlović as new rossoblù boss.

On 14 April 2009, Giuseppe Papadopulo was appointed as the new manager, and successfully managed to raise the team spirit avoiding relegation to Serie B only in the last match of the season. In the 2009–10 season, Bologna played in Serie A for the 65th time, and escaped relegation again despite financial issues under new head coach Franco Colomba.

In June 2010, a club takeover was completed, with the club being sold by the Menarini family to Sardinian entrepreneur Sergio Porcedda. Franco Colomba was sacked right before the 2010–11 season opener on 29 August 2010, despite surviving relegation with the team in the 2009–10 season. The president of the club, Sergio Porcedda, said that the decision was made mostly "because he [Colomba] was skeptical of the team."

The consortium "Bologna 2010"

On 23 December 2010, the consortium Bologna 2010 led by banker Giovanni Consorte and coffee businessman Massimo Zanetti acquired the club from Sergio Porcedda, after the latter failed to pay wages for the club during his short-tenured ownership and put Bologna in threat of bankruptcy. The company also owed agent fee to Leonardo Corsi in the Andrea Raggi's transfer. Zanetti also became the new club chairman, with popular Italian musician and long-time Bologna supporter Gianni Morandi appointed as honorary president.

On 21 January 2011, chairman Massimo Zanetti and CEO Luca Baraldi, after only 28 days, resigned because of irreconcilable differences with the other personal and financial partners.
Stefano Pedrelli became the new director general. For 76 days, the chairman was Marco Pavignani.

From 7 April 2011, after the resignation of Pavignani and having paid €2.5m of capital increase, the new chairman was Albano Guaraldi, the second largest shareholder of the consortium "Bologna 2010" with the 17% of the quotas, behind the outgoing Zanetti.

The 2013–14 season saw Bologna once again relegated to the Serie B, and also gave light to a number of financial problems involving the club and its ownership of Albino Guaraldi, who was considerably criticized by the team supporters also for a number of controversial decisions, including the sale of star player Alessandro Diamanti to Chinese club Guangzhou Evergrande. A new head coach was then found in former Cagliari boss Diego López for the new season, whereas Guaraldi clearly stated his intention to hand over his Bologna stakes to a new owner. A North American group headed by Joe Tacopina and Joey Saputo (owner of CF Montréal, also the team of former Bologna hero Marco Di Vaio) then stated its interest in acquiring the club; this was followed by another offer coming from former chairman Massimo Zanetti. On 15 October 2014, the board of directors ratified the sale of the club to BFC 1909 Lux SPV, and Tacopina became the new club chairman.

The consortium "BFC 1909 Lux Spv"
Under the new ownership of which BFC 1909 Lux Spv S.A. of Luxemburg is an intermediate holding company, Bologna was promoted back to Serie A in 2015. Saputo also succeeded Tacopina as the new chairman of the board of directors of Bologna on 17 November 2014.

In their first season back in Serie A, Bologna finished 14th avoiding relegation.  In the following two seasons, Bologna finished in 15th place on the table. In the 2018-19 Serie A season, Bologna finished in a creditable 10th position on the table.
Over the next three seasons, Bologna continued to finish mid table in Serie A coming 12th two campaigns in a row followed by a 13th placed finish in the 2021/2022 season.

Stadium

The official stadium of Bologna is the Stadio Renato Dall'Ara. Dall'Ara is the biggest sports building of Bologna and its name is taken from an ex-chairman of the club, Renato Dall'Ara, who died three days before the final for Serie A's Scudetto. Its capacity is 38,500. The curva Bulgarelli (in English, Bulgarelli curve), the curve of Bologna's ultras, is dedicated to player Giacomo Bulgarelli, who died on 21 February 2009. The other curve, part of which is reserved for the away fans, is dedicated to Árpád Weisz, coach of Bologna's winning pre-war team, and killed by the Nazis in a concentration camp during WWII.

Players

Current squad

Other players under contract

Out on loan

Chairmen history
Bologna have had numerous Chairmen over the course of their history, some of which have been the owners of the club, others have been honorary chairmen. Here is a complete list of Bologna chairmen from 1909 until the present day.

Club staff

Managerial history
Bologna have had many managers and trainers, some seasons they have had co-managers running the team. Here is a chronological list of them from 1920 onwards.

Sponsors

Kit sponsors
 1978–1979: Admiral
 1980–1982: Tepa Sport
 1982–1988: Ennerre
 1988–1993: Uhlsport
 1993–1996: Erreà
 1996–2000: Diadora
 2000–2001: Umbro
 2001–present: Macron

Official sponsors
 1981–1982: Febal
 1982–1983: Pasta Bertagni
 1983–1984: Pasta Corticella
 1984–1985: Ebano
 1985–1986: Idrolitina
 1986–1989: Segafredo
 1989–1992: Mercatone Uno
 1992–1993: Sinudyne
 1993–1994: Buona Natura
 1994–1997: Carisbo
 1997–2001: Granarolo
 2001–2004: Area Banca
 2004–2005: Amica Chips
 2005–2006: Europonteggi
 December 2006: Motor Show
 January–March 2007: Woolrich
 March–June 2007: Volvo
 December 2007 – March 2008: Joe Marmellata
 April–June 2008: Carisbo
 September 2008 – June 2009: Unipol
 August–September 2009: Cogei
 October–November 2009: Cerasarda
 November 2009 – June 2010: BIGPoker.it
 October 2010 – Cerasarda
 October 2009 – Ceramica Serenissima
 August 2014 – June 2015: +energia
 August 2011 – June 2015: NGM
 September 2015 – June 2018: FAAC – Illumia
 June 2018–June 2020: Liu·Jo
 September 2020–June 2022: Facile Ristrutturare – Selenella – Illumia
 June 2022–Present: Cazoo – Lavoropiù

Statistics

Honours

Domestic

League
Serie A
Winners (7): 1924–25, 1928–29, 1935–36, 1936–37, 1938–39, 1940–41, 1963–64
Serie B
Winners (2): 1987–88, 1995–96
Serie C1
Winners : 1994–95

Cups
Coppa Italia
Winners (2): 1969–70, 1973–74

International
Mitropa Cup
Winners (3): 1932, 1934, 1961
UEFA Intertoto Cup
Winners (1): 1998
Anglo-Italian League Cup
Winners (1): 1970

Divisional movements

References

External links

 

 
Football clubs in Italy
Football clubs in Emilia-Romagna
Sport in Bologna
Association football clubs established in 1909
Italian football First Division clubs
Serie A clubs
Serie B clubs
Serie C clubs
Serie A winning clubs
Coppa Italia winning clubs
1909 establishments in Italy
UEFA Intertoto Cup winning clubs